Varna Municipality is a seaside municipality (obshtina) in Varna Province, Northeastern Bulgaria, located on the Bulgarian Black Sea Coast and near Varna lake. It is named after its administrative centre - the city of Varna - which is also the capital of the homonymous province.

Settlements 

Varna Municipality includes the following 6 places (towns are shown in bold):

Demography 
The following table shows the change of the population during the last four decades.

Ethnic composition
According to the 2011 census, among those who answered the optional question on ethnic identification, the ethnic composition of the municipality was the following:

Religion
According to the latest Bulgarian census of 2011, the religious composition, among those who answered the optional question on religious identification, was the following:

See also
Provinces of Bulgaria
Municipalities of Bulgaria
List of cities and towns in Bulgaria

References

External links
 Official website